One of the Boys is a Philippine television sitcom starring Joey de Leon and Eula Caballero. It was aired from May 3 to July 5, 2014 on TV5.

Cast
 Joey de Leon as Daddy Jerry "DJ" Silang
 Eula Caballero as Gabi Silang
 Empoy Marquez as Aga Silang
 BJ Forbes as Sonny Silang
 Nadine Samonte
 Daniel Marsh as Daniel 
 Brian Wilson as Brian
 Charlie Stucclife as Charlie
 Michael McDonnell as Miko
 Henry Edwards as Henry Potter
 Marco Chavez as Dondon Silang

See also 
 List of programs aired by The 5 Network

References

External links 
 

TV5 (Philippine TV network) original programming
Philippine comedy television series
Philippine television sitcoms
2014 Philippine television series debuts
2014 Philippine television series endings
Filipino-language television shows